The Barrio de Analco Historic District is a National Historic Landmark District centered at the junction of East De Vargas Street and Old Santa Fe Trail in Santa Fe, New Mexico.  The seven buildings of the district represent one of the oldest clusters of what were basically working-class or lower-class residences in North America, and are in a cross-section of pre-statehood architectural styles.  It includes two of the oldest colonial-era buildings in the southwest, the San Miguel Mission church (1710), and the "Oldest House", built in 1620 and now a museum.  The district was declared a National Historic Landmark in 1968.

Description and history
The Barrio de Analco is located on the south side of the Santa Fe River, across the river from the main downtown area that includes the Santa Fe Plaza and the Palace of the Governors.  The district is anchored at the junction of Old Santa Fe Trail and East De Vargas Street, and extends a short way (partial blocks) to the south, east and west.  The San Miguel Mission church, on a site occupied by a church since the 1610s, is at the southeast corner, and the 1620 "Oldest House", a two-story adobe construction, is at the northeast corner.  South of the mission is the Lamy Building, also known as St. Michael's Dormitory, an 1878 school building that exemplifies the Territorial style that was common in the pre-statehood era.

West of the main junction, separated from it by the Santa Fe Playhouse, are the Gregorio Crespin House and the Roque Tudesqui House, both built in the Spanish Pueblo style.  The Crespin House was built in the mid-18th century; the construction date of the Tudesqui House is unknown, but probably 18th century.  Separated from the rest of the district near the junction of East De Vargas and Paseo de Peralta are the Boyle House, also a mid-18th century Spanish Pueblo building, and the Bandelier House, an 1867 Territorial style house that is further notable as a home of archaeologist Adolph Bandelier.

The name "Analco" comes from the Nahuatl language spoken by the Tlaxcaltec people who accompanied the Spanish. "A" = water + "nal" = next to + "co" place of = next to the water (in this case a stream, the Santa Fe River).  The barrio was established not long after Santa Fe's founding in 1609-10, as a district for artists, laborers, and servants, while the area north of the river was occupied by the wealthy and powerful.  The buildings in this district, largely built to serve that type of community through several centuries, document the changes in architecture from a nearly pure native adobe construction (the "Oldest House"), to the Spanish Pueblo style, and then the Territorial.

See also

National Register of Historic Places listings in Santa Fe County, New Mexico
List of National Historic Landmarks in New Mexico

References

External links

Historic districts on the National Register of Historic Places in New Mexico
History of Santa Fe County, New Mexico
Geography of Santa Fe County, New Mexico
National Historic Landmarks in New Mexico
Historic American Buildings Survey in New Mexico
Northern Rio Grande National Heritage Area
National Register of Historic Places in Santa Fe, New Mexico